Live at Cuesta College is the debut album by the band CPR. It is a live document of their 1997 tour issued in limited release only via the CPR website.

Track listing
"In My Dreams" – 6:51
"Tracks in the Dust" – 5:48
"Homewards Through the Haze" – 6:21
"Rusty & Blue" – 9:50
"Thousand Roads" – 5:33
"For Free" – 7:28
"Morrison" – 6:54
"Somehow She Knew" – 9:46
"'Til It Shines on You" – 4:56
"Time Is the Final Currency" – 8:01
"Where Will I Be/Page 43" – 6:06
"Delta" – 5:53
"Déjà Vu" – 12:13
"One for Every Moment" – 5:53
"Guinnevere" – 7:13
"Wooden Ships" – 10:12

External links
 CPR Website

1998 live albums
CPR (band) live albums